Savona (originally Savona's Ferry) is a small community located at the west end of Kamloops Lake, where the Thompson River exits it.  It is approximately halfway between Kamloops and Cache Creek along the Trans-Canada Highway.  The countryside surrounding the community is semi-arid grasslands and hills, which support cattle ranching and agriculture. It has about 2000 hours of sunshine and less than 12 inches of precipitation a year.  It has a population of approximately 650.

It was a stagecoach stop, the location of a ferry across the Thompson River, and later moved to take advantage of the Canadian Pacific Railway built on the south side of the river.

History

Savona was originally located on the north shore of Kamloops Lake, where it was the end of the stagecoach line from Cache Creek on the Cariboo Wagon Road (later improved as the Trans-Canada Highway). Originally passengers continuing on to the goldfields of the Big Bend of the Columbia River had to take the steamboat up the lake to Kamloops and the Shuswap Country. Savona was first called Bout Du Lac by the French fur traders in the mid-1800s but around 1858 a man named Francois Saveneux built a ferry to cross the mouth of the Thompson River and then the town was renamed Savona's Ferry.

In 1884 Savona was designated as the eastern end of Andrew Onderdonk's contract for building the Canadian Pacific Railway (CPR) for the Canadian government.  Onderdonk continued building eastward under a CPR contract.  As the railway was built on the south side of the river, most of the houses were pulled across the lake on the ice, moving the community to where it is today. Some buildings that were moved across the lake include the General Store. In 1915, the Canadian Northern Pacific Railway, now part of Canadian National Railway, was built along the north side of Kamloops Lake.

The Savona area is the traditional territory of the Skeetchestn Indian Band.  Their main reserve, Skeetchestn Indian Reserve, comprising 7975.70 ha., is located on the north side of the Thompson River west of Savona, and reaching up the valley of the Deadman River.

Services and attractions

Campgrounds
Steelhead Provincial Park in Savona has 44 campsites with firepits, picnic tables, showers, and flush toilets. 10 campsites have water and power available for users. The campground is located at the mouth of the Thompson River, and attracts many people looking to fish. Each campsite boasts wonderful mountain and lake views. The park is 38 hectares in size and is located 40 km west of Kamloops, British Columbia on British Columbia Highway 1. Historically, the land was used as a First Nations fishing site. In the 1800 and 1900s, it was used as a ferry landing to get across the Thompson River, as well as a stagecoach depot. The park still hosts multiple historical buildings and a cemetery. Steelhead Provincial Park is open from May 1 until October 12.

Tunkwa Provincial Park is located 24 km from Savona on the Tunkwa Lake Road, midway between Savona and Logan Lake. The 5,100-hectare park holds two man-made trout fishing lakes, Tunkwa Lake and Leighton Lake. This year-round recreational area is utilized for fishing, horseback riding, camping, hunting, and snowmobiling. Many ATV trails surround the park, as well. Although the park is open year-round, full use campsites are open from May 1 until October 12. The Tunkwa and Leighton campgrounds hold 275 vehicle accessible campsites.

Juniper Beach Provincial Park is located midway between Savona and Cache Creek on Highway 1. The 260-hectare park has 30 vehicle accessible campsites and is open from April 26 to October 14. The campground is located directly on the Thompson River and attracts many fishers looking for salmon, trout, sturgeon, and steelhead
.

References

External links
"Savona, British Columbia" on britishcolumbia.com
An aerial view of Savona and Kamloops Lake from Randall & Kat's Flying Photos

Designated places in British Columbia
Savona
Populated places in the Thompson-Nicola Regional District
Thompson Country